The gilled lungfish (Protopterus amphibius), also known as the East African lungfish, is a species of African lungfish. It is found in the swamps and flood plains of East Africa, and has been positively identified in Kenya, Somalia and Mozambique. Records from Tanzania require confirmation and may be the result of introductions.

Description
This lungfish is uniform blue or slate grey in colour. It has small or inconspicuous black spots and a pale grey belly. Like all African lungfish it has two lungs and is an obligate air-breather. Also, like all other African lungfish, it is able to burrow and form a mucous cocoon for protection in a process known as estivation.

Habitat 
The gilled lungfish is a primarily demersal fish, living largely within the riverbeds of the Zambezi River system of East Africa. It also inhabits similar areas in the wetlands of the region.

Conservation 
The gilled lungfish is listed as Least Concern, partially because reported numbers are high and partially because of the lack of data. It is eaten for food by some natives of the area however the numbers lost to this practice are very small. More dangerous threats are the damming of the Zambezi, which will reduce the size of the delta in which the fish live, and pollution in areas that the fish inhabit as well as encroachment of wetlands for agriculture that reduces the available habitat.

References

 LungFish.info
 Gosse, J.-P. 1984 Protopteridae. p. 8-17. In J. Daget, J.-P. Gosse and D.F.E. Thys van den Audenaerde (eds.) Check-list of the freshwater fishes of Africa (CLOFFA). Volume I. ORSTOM, Paris and MRAC, Tervuren. 410 p. (Ref. 3498)  
 Nelson, J. S. 2006. Fishes of the World, 4th edition. Hoboken, NJ: John Wiley & Sons. .
 Rosen, D. E., P. I. Forey, B. G. Gardiner, and C. Patterson. 1981. Lungfishes, tetrapods, paleontology, and plesiomorphy. Bull. Am. Mus. Nat. Hist. 167(4): 159-276.
 Schultze, H. P., and J. Chorn. 1997. The Permo-Carboniferous genus Sagenodus and the beginning of modern lungfish. Contributions to Zoology 61(7): 9-70.

gilled lungfish
Fauna of East Africa
Least concern biota of Africa
gilled lungfish
gilled lungfish